René Vermandel (23 March 1893 – 20 April 1958) was a Belgian cyclist. He most notably won Liège–Bastogne–Liège in 1923 and 1924, as well as the 1921 Tour of Flanders. He finished in 2nd place in the 1923 Paris–Roubaix and 4th place in the 1921 Paris–Roubaix. He also rode in the 1921 Tour de France.

Major results

1913
 5th Liège–Bastogn–Liège
1920
 3rd Road race, National Road Championships
 3rd Paris–Brussels
 8th Paris–Tours
 10th Overall Tour of Belgium
1st Stages 3 & 4
1921
 1st  National Cyclo-cross Championships
 1st Tour of Flanders
 1st Overall Tour of Belgium
1st Stage 3
 1st Scheldeprijs
 1st Schaal Sels
 1st Paris–Dijon
 1st De Drie Zustersteden
 2nd Road race, National Road Championships
 2nd Critérium des As
 4th Paris–Roubaix
1922
 1st  Road race, National Road Championships
 1st Critérium des As
 1st Overall Tour of Belgium
1st Stages 1, 2 & 3
 1st Overall Criterium du Midi
1st Stages 1, 2 & 3
 1st Jemeppe–Marche–Jemeppe
 1st Stage 1 
 3rd Paris–Brussels
1923
 1st Liège–Bastogne–Liège
 1st Schaal Sels
 1st Overall Circuit de Champagne
1st Stages 1 & 2
 1st 
 2nd Paris–Roubaix
 3rd Road race, National Road Championships
 5th Overall Tour of Belgium
1st Stage 4
1924
 1st  Road race, National Road Championships
 1st Liège–Bastogne–Liège
 1st Scheldeprijs
 1st Stages 1 & 5 Tour of Belgium
 1st Stage 3 Criterium du Midi
 2nd Tour of Flanders
 3rd Schaal Sels
1925
 1st Overall Criterium du Midi
1st Stage 1
 3rd Schaal Sels
1926
 1st Rund um Leipzig
 2nd Schaal Sels
1927
 1st Rund um Leipzig
1928
 3rd Overall Tour of Belgium
1st Stage 3

References

External links

1893 births
1958 deaths
Belgian male cyclists
Cyclists from East Flanders
People from Zelzate
Belgian cyclo-cross champions